Karl Gannon (born 11 September 1974 in Dublin) is an Irish former footballer.

He made his League of Ireland debut for Home Farm at Waterford United on 6 October 1991. He was the top scorer in the 1993–94 League of Ireland First Division with 16 goals.

He signed for Shamrock Rovers in 1995 where he stayed for two seasons making two appearances in European competition before signing for Waterford United.

His father, Mick Gannon, played for Shamrock Rovers in the 1970s.

References 

Republic of Ireland association footballers
Home Farm F.C. players
Shamrock Rovers F.C. players
Waterford F.C. players
League of Ireland players
Association footballers from Dublin (city)
1974 births
Living people
Drumcondra F.C. players
Association football forwards